A Master of Science in Engineering (abbreviated MSE, M.Sc.Eng. or MScEng) is a type of Master of Science awarded by universities in many countries. It is an academic degree to be differentiated from a Master of Engineering. A Master of Science in engineering can require completion of a thesis and qualifies the holder to apply for a program leading to a Doctor of Philosophy (often abbreviated Ph.D. or D.Phil.) in engineering, while a Master of Engineering can require completion of a project rather than thesis and usually does not qualify its holder to apply for a Ph.D. or D.Phil. in engineering. The Master of Science in engineering is considered equivalent to diplom degree in engineering in the countries that do not have a specific distinction between M.Eng. and M.Sc.Eng.

See also 
 Engineering education, about the structure in many different countries
 Engineer's degree

References

Engineering, Master of Science in
Engineering education

de:Diplom-Ingenieur#Der Diplom-Ingenieur
fi:Diplomi-insinööri